Skorkov is name of several locations in the Czech Republic: 
Skorkov (Havlíčkův Brod District) 
Skorkov (Mladá Boleslav District)